Stenocercus tricristatus is a species of lizard of the Tropiduridae family. It is found in Brazil.

References

Stenocercus
Reptiles described in 1851
Reptiles of Brazil
Endemic fauna of Brazil
Taxa named by Auguste Duméril